Swimming at the 5th East Asian Games was held 6–10 December 2009 in Kowloon, Hong Kong. The competition featured 40 long course (50m) events: 20 for males, 20 for females.

Participating nations
7 nations had swimmers in the 2009 East Asian Games:

Event schedule

Results

Men

Women

Medal standings

References

Events at the 2009 East Asian Games
Swimming at the East Asian Games
East Asian Games